Vokesimurex recurvirostrum, common name : the bent-beak murex, is a species of sea snail, a marine gastropod mollusk in the family Muricidae, the murex snails or rock snails.

Description
The shell size varies between 36 mm and 88 mm

Distribution
This species is distributed in the Caribbean Sea off Mexico and Ecuador.

References

External links
 

Gastropods described in 1833
Vokesimurex